Ho Chi Minh City University of Culture is a university in District 2 of Ho Chi Minh City. This university includes programs for Journalism, Tourism, Museum Management, Information - Library Management, Culture Management, Folk Culture, Cultural Studies, Traditional Culture, and Asian Culture.

References 

Universities in Ho Chi Minh City